Lenard Duane Moore (born February 13, 1958) in Jacksonville, North Carolina.
He is a writer of more than 20 forms of poetry, drama, essays, and literary criticism, and has been writing and publishing haiku for more than 20 years.

In 2008, Moore became the first Southerner and the first African American to be elected as president of the Haiku Society of America. He is executive chairman of the North Carolina Haiku Society, founder and executive director of the Carolina African American Writers' Collective, and cofounder of Washington Street Writers' Group. He has won the Sam Ragan Fine Arts Award for his contribution to the fine arts of North Carolina.

Poetry
Moore's poetry has been translated into several languages. He is the author of:
Poems of Love & Understanding (Carlton Press, 1982)
The Open Eye (NC Haiku Society Press, 1985)
Forever Home (St. Andrews College Press, 1992)
Desert Storm: A Brief History (Los Hombres Press, 1993)

Moore has taught workshops, served on literary panels, and given hundreds of readings at schools, festivals, colleges, and universities, including National Black Arts Festival, Zora Neale Hurston Festival, People’s Poetry Gathering, Walt Whitman Cultural Arts Center (Camden, New Jersey), and The Library of Congress.

Awards
1983, 1994, 2003 Tokyo Museum of Haiku Literature Award
1987-1988 Japan Air Lines Haiku Contest finalist out of 40,000 entries
1992 First prize winner in traditional style haiku, Mainichi Daily News:Tokyo, Japan
1992 Third prize, Harold G. Henderson Award, Haiku Society of America
1996 Indies Arts Award
1997 Margaret Walker Creative Writing Award
1998 Tar Heel of the Week Award
1998-2000 Cave Canem Fellow
2000 Alumni Achievement Award
2001 The Heron's Nest Award, first runner-up for poem "summer moon-"
2006 Sam Ragan Fine Arts Award for contributing to the fine arts of North Carolina

Publications

Features
His poems, essays, and reviews have appeared in more than 350 publications, such as:
AGNI
Callaloo
African American Review
Midwest Quarterly
North Dakota Quarterly
Obsidian III 
Poetry Canada Review

Anthologies
Moore's poetry has appeared in more than forty anthologies, including:
Ghost Fishing: An Eco-Justice Anthology (UGA Press, 2018)
Haiku in English (W.W. Norton, 2013)
Gathering Ground (University of Michigan Press, 2006)
The Haiku Anthology (W.W. Norton, 1999)
Trouble The Water: 250 Years of African American Poetry (Mentor Books, 1997)
Spirit & Flame: An Anthology of African American Poetry (Syracuse University Press, 1997)
Haiku World: An International Poetry Almanac (Kodansha International Ltd., 1996)
The Garden Thrives: Twentieth Century African American Poetry (Harper Collins, 1996)
HEIWA: Peace Poetry in English and Japanese (University of Hawaii Press, 1995)
In Search of Color Everywhere: A Collection of African-American Poetry (Stewart, Tabori & Chang, 1994)
Haiku Moment: An Anthology of Contemporary North American Haiku (Charles E. Tuttle Co., 1993)

He is coeditor (with Michael Dylan Welch) of the 2007 Haiku North America conference anthology, titled Dandelion Wind.

Electronic media
Moore has been featured on several radio and television programs, including:
The Story: with Dick Gordon (broadcaster), Finding Haiku, a radio interview that aired August 20, 2007.
Spirit of the Ark, a TBS Documentary that aired August 5, 1996
Voice of America, radio program.

Speaking engagements
He is a copresenter in An Evening with Sonia Sanchez, African Americans Writing Haiku, and African American Quilts and the Women Who Make Them.

Education
Moore earned his M.A. degree in English/African American Literature from North Carolina's A&T State University, and his B.A. degree with magna cum laude honors from Shaw University. He was also educated at Coastal Carolina Community College and the University of Maryland.

He is currently an assistant professor of English at Mount Olive College. He is a former adjunct professor at Shaw University. He has also taught at North Carolina State University-Raleigh, N.C., A&T State University-Greensboro, and Enloe High School. He is a former writer-in-residence for United Arts Council of Raleigh & Wake County.

Background
Moore worked with his great-grandmother on a farm while growing up. He has lived in South Carolina, Virginia, California, and Germany, where he served in the U.S. Army. He writes about family, jazz, identity, and global issues. Moore is working on two poetry collections, a novel, short stories, a play, and literary criticism.

References

External links
 Interview with Moore on The Story with Dick Gordon website.

1958 births
American male poets
English-language haiku poets
Living people